The Murder of John Brewen (1592) is a pamphlet concerning the murder of a goldsmith by his wife. It is presumed to have been written by the Elizabethan playwright, Thomas Kyd (1558–1594).

Genre
Before the existence of large daily newspapers since the late 18th century, news of the day, including sensationalist pieces, of which this is one example, were communicated by such pamphlets or else by ballads. Though written by a playwright, it does not seem to have been produced as a play in Elizabethan times.

Nevertheless, it shows some affinity with domestic tragedies of the period, all on the subject of woman's adulterous proclivities, such as A Yorkshire Tragedy, Arden of Faversham, and A Woman Killed with Kindness. William Shakespeare's Othello, to a lesser extent The Winter's Tale and The Merry Wives of Windsor, are additional examples of this category, except that in each case the woman's adultery is falsely imagined by the husband. Domestic tragedies include the murder of other family members, such as the lost Jacobean play Keep the Widow Waking, in which a son kills his mother.

The Elizabethan Journals

The description of the murder is given in "The Elizabethan Journals". with the following entry of a current event in 1592:

Modern adaptation

"John Brewen" adapted at Wikiversity

References

Early Modern English literature
Pamphlets
1592 books